Thomas Ian McPherson (born 14 October 1942) is a Scottish former first-class cricketer.

McPherson was born in October 1942 at Scone, Perthshire. He was educated at Perth Academy. A club cricketer for Perthshire Cricket Club, he made his debut Scotland in first-class cricket against Ireland at Dublin in 1977. He made four further first-class appearances for Scotland to 1979, which included matches against the touring New Zealanders in 1978 and Sri Lankans in 1979. Playing in the Scottish side as a slow left-arm orthodox bowler, he took 10 wickets in his five matches at an average of exactly 23, with best figures of 4 for 74. As a tailend batsman, he scored 83 runs at a batting average of 20.75, with a highest score of 28. Outside of cricket, McPherson was by profession a computer analyst.

References

External links
 

1942 births
Living people
Cricketers from Perth and Kinross
People educated at Perth Academy
Scottish cricketers